Lisa Anne Pruitt (born April 2, 1966) is an American mechanical engineer known for her research on orthopedic biomaterials and medical polymers.

Early life and education 
Born in Cambridge, Massachusetts, Pruitt double-majored in Materials Engineering and Chemical and Ocean Engineering at the University of Rhode Island, earning two bachelor's degrees in 1988. She earned her master's and PhD degrees from Brown University in 1990 and 1993 respectively.

Career and research 
She began her career at the University of California, Berkeley in 1993 as an assistant professor of mechanical engineering; she was appointed a chancellor’s professor in 2004 and Lawrence Talbot Chair in engineering in 2007. In addition to her position as professor of mechanical engineering, she is also a professor of bioengineering at UC Berkeley and an adjunct professor of orthopaedic surgery at the University of California, San Francisco.

Honors and awards 
Notable awards include
 UC Berkeley's  Distinguished Teaching Award 
 U.S. Presidential Award for Excellence in Science, Mathematics and Engineering Mentoring
Fellow of the  American Association for the Advancement of Science
National Science Foundation CAREER Award
 2011 Winner of the A. Richard Newton ABIE Award from the Anita Borg Institute.

References 

1966 births
Living people
American mechanical engineers
20th-century American engineers
21st-century American engineers
People from Cambridge, Massachusetts
University of Rhode Island alumni
Brown University School of Engineering alumni
University of California, San Francisco faculty
UC Berkeley College of Engineering faculty